The Reserve Bank of Fiji (RBF) is the central bank of the Pacific island country of Fiji.  The responsibilities of the RBF include issue of currency, control of money supply, currency exchange, monetary stability, promotion of sound finances, and fostering economic development.

The Bank is the only institution that is permitted to issue Fijian dollars and put them into circulation.  It is also responsible for setting the overnight policy rate, the main policy or bank rate for Fiji.

History
In 1914 the colonial government established the Currency Board with the sole right to issue notes and coins in the then Colony of Fiji.  Following independence from Britain in 1970, a new institution was created in 1973, the Central Monetary Authority (CMA) which took over the issuing of currency and also took on an expanded remit.

The CMA was tasked with regulating the issue of currency and the supply, availability and international exchange of money; promoting monetary stability; promoting a sound financial structure; and fostering credit and exchange conditions for the economic development of Fiji.  It also acted as banker to the government.  By the 1980s the government of Fiji wanted to expand its role and Bank of Fiji was created by the Reserve Bank of Fiji Act, 1983.

Statutory responsibilities 
The functions, powers, and responsibilities of the Bank were specified in the Reserve Bank of Fiji Act, 1983. The principal purposes of the Bank as stated in Part ll, Section 4 of the Reserve Bank Act were as follows:

To regulate the issue of currency, and the supply, availability and international exchange of money;
To promote monetary stability;
To promote a sound financial structure;
To foster credit and exchange conditions conducive to the orderly and balanced economic development of the country".

Governors
General Managers of the Central Monetary Authority of Fiji 1973-1983
 1973-1974: Ian Craik
 1974-1977: R J A Earland
 1977-1980: H J Tomkins 
 1980-1983: Savenaca Siwatibau

Governors of the Reserve Bank of Fiji since 1983
 1983-1988: Savenaca Siwatibau
 1988-2000: Ratu Jone Kubuabola
 2000-2009: Savenaca Narube
 2009-2010: Sada Reddy
 2010-2017: Barry Whiteside
 2017-: Faizul Ariff Ali

Departments and functions 

The Bank has four main departments – economics, financial markets, financial institutions and currency and corporate services. The key roles of each department are as follows:

Economics

The Economics department's main responsibility is to conduct economic analysis and provide advice on the formulation of monetary policy. Some of the key tasks performed by the department are as follows:

Monitoring economic and financial developments and providing advice on appropriate monetary policy settings in Fiji;

Undertaking research and preparing economic forecasts;

Writing and co-ordinating the Bank's publications; and

Co-ordinating economic policy with relevant authorities.

Financial Markets

The Financial Markets department has the primary responsibility for implementing monetary policy, managing Fiji's foreign reserves and providing banking services to the Government. It also handles foreign exchange regulation and control as well as exchange rates. Its key functions include:

Conducting open market operations to achieve operational monetary policy targets;

Managing Fiji's foreign reserves;

Maintaining appropriate exchange rate arrangements;

Acting as a fiscal agent of the Fiji Government and registrar for debt instruments issued by the Fiji Government. This function has also been extended to a number of statutory corporations;

Providing banking services to Government and commercial banks; and

Administering exchange controls to monitor and regulate capital flows through the banking system.

Financial Institutions

The Financial Institutions department's major objective is to maintain a sound market-based financial system through prudential supervision of licensed financial institutions and the insurance industry. Key areas of duties include:

Regularly reviewing international developments in the area of financial system supervision and payment system structure and their impact on the supervisory arrangements in Fiji;

Supervising licensed financial institutions and maintaining confidence by minimising detriments to the interests of depositors and policyholders;

Processing applications for those wishing to become licensed banks, credit institutions, insurers, brokers and agents; and

Ensuring that prudential policies and guidelines are up to date and that licensed institutions conform to these standard requirements.

Currency and Corporate Services

The Currency and Corporate Services department has primary responsibility for currency issue and internal administration of the Bank, including financial reporting and human resources management. Its key areas of work include:

Ensuring availability and supply of good quality currency;

Ensuring that the Bank has a qualified and trained workforce to meet the output requirements;

Providing support services to other departments in the Bank; and

Ensuring that the financial accounts of the Bank are prepared in a timely manner.

Other activities

The Bank is also active in promoting financial inclusion policy and is a leading member of the Alliance for Financial Inclusion. It is also one of the original 17 regulatory institutions to make specific national commitments to financial inclusion under the Maya Declaration during the 2011 Global Policy Forum held in Mexico.

Reserve Bank of Fiji building

The Reserve Bank of Fiji Building is in Suva, Fiji and was Fiji's first skyscraper and the tallest building in Fiji. The fourteen storey building was commissioned in the late 1970s and completed in 1984.

References

External links
Reserve Bank of Fiji official site
Reserve bank building data sheet 
Architect's page on reserve bank

Government buildings completed in 1984
Fiji
Reserve Bank building
Skyscraper office buildings
Buildings and structures in Suva
1984 establishments in Fiji